is a Japanese footballer currently playing as a defender for YSCC Yokohama.

Career statistics

Club
.

Notes

References

1998 births
Living people
Association football people from Tokyo
Heisei International University alumni
Japanese footballers
Japanese expatriate footballers
Association football defenders
J3 League players
Kashiwa Reysol players
YSCC Yokohama players
Japanese expatriate sportspeople in Australia
Expatriate soccer players in Australia